El Profesor  may refer to:

El Profesor (character), or Sergio Marquina, a character in Money Heist (original title La casa de papel), a Spanish heist television series
El Profesor (politician), a nickname of Carlos Hank González, Mexican politician

See also

Professor (disambiguation)